Donald H. (Don) Liles (born February 14, 1947) was an American engineer, Professor of Industrial Engineering at the University of Texas at Arlington, known for his seminal work on enterprise engineering.

Biography 
Liles studied engineering at the University of Texas at Arlington, where he received his BS in 1970, his MS in 1974 and his PhD in 1978 all in industrial engineering.

Liles has spent his academic career at the University of Texas at Arlington, starting in 1979 as assistant professor and later associate professor. From 1989 to 1998 he was also associate director at the Automation and Robotics Research Institute. From 1998 to 2012 he was professor of industrial engineering, and chair of the IMSE Department at the University of Texas at Arlington.

Liles has been executive council member of the Texas Manufacturing Assistance Center, and member of the National Honor Society for Industrial Engineering.

Publications 
Liles authored and co-authored several books and articles. Books:
 
 

Articles, a selection:

References

External links 

 Dr. Don Liles at uta.edu.

Year of birth missing (living people)
Living people
21st-century American engineers
Enterprise modelling experts
Systems engineers
University of Texas at Arlington alumni
University of Texas at Arlington faculty
1940s births